The Morgan Commercial and Normal College Marker is installed in Salt Lake City, in the U.S. state of Utah.

References

External links

 First Successful Educational Institution in the Territory of Utah - Morgan Commercial & Normal College - Salt Lake City, Utah  at Waymarking

Buildings and structures in Salt Lake City
Monuments and memorials in Utah
Outdoor sculptures in Salt Lake City
Sculptures of men in Utah